Sylvester Neelon (January 7, 1825 – December 31, 1897) was an Ontario businessman and political figure. He represented Lincoln in the Legislative Assembly of Ontario as a Liberal member in 1875 and from 1879 to 1886.

He was born in New York state in 1825 and came to St. Catharines, Upper Canada with his parents in 1832. In 1852, he formed a shipping firm in partnership with James Norris. The company also purchased a flour mill, which Neelon retained when the partnership was dissolved. He continued to own ships and also manufactured barrels for the transporting of goods. He was also involved in railways, banking, the sale of dry goods, a paper mill and a tavern. Neelon married Cinderella Read and married his second wife, Louisa Latham Chisholm, in 1884 after Cinderella's death. He served on the town council for St. Catharines. In 1875, he was elected to the provincial legislative assembly but unseated for buying votes; he was reelected in 1879. His construction company won a masonry contract for Toronto's city hall in 1889.

He died in Toronto in 1897.

External links
Biography at the Dictionary of Canadian Biography Online
Member's parliamentary history for the Legislative Assembly of Ontario

1825 births
1897 deaths
Ontario Liberal Party MPPs